Kim Seong-ju (Korean: 김성주; Hanja: 金成柱; 10 April 1964) is a South Korean entrepreneur and politician who is the representative of the Jeonju C constituency in the National Assembly. He served as the Chairman of the National Pension Service from 2017 to 2019.

Early life and education 
Kim was born in Jeonju, North Jeolla Province, South Korea on April 10, 1964. During Chun Doo-hwan's regime, he was arrested and put in prison two times for participating in democratization movements. The human rights lawyer that defended Kim at the time was Park Won-soon, the Mayor of Seoul from 2011 to 2020. He graduated from Seoul University in 1988 and established a computer software-related company called Hannuri Computer (now called Hannuri Net) and became a successful youth entrepreneur. He is often called "the Bill Gates of Jeonju" due to his successful computer-related business career.

Political career 
Kim ran in the 1998 South Korean local elections to become a member of the Jeonju City Council, however, he came in second place and lost the election. He ran in the 2006 South Korean local elections and was elected a member to the North Jeolla Provincial Assembly. He was reelected to the North Jeolla Provincial Assembly in the 2010 South Korean local elections. Kim was a candidate for the North Jeolla (Jeonbuk) Jeonju Deokjin-gu constituency in the 2012 South Korean legislative election and was elected with 62.52% of the vote. 

In the 2016 South Korean legislative election, Kim Seong-ju ran for the Jeonju C constituency as the Democratic Party of Korea candidate, but lost to Chung Dong-young of the People's Party by 0.75% and 989 votes.

On November 7, 2017, Kim assumed the office of Chairman of the National Pension Service. Moon Jae-in and his cabinet were criticized by opposition parties such as the Liberty Korea Party and People's Party for revolving door politics. Except for being a member of the Health and Welfare Committee during the 19th session of the National Assembly, Kim had no experience regarding social security and social welfare. He resigned from his post on December 30, 2019 in order to prepare for the 2020 South Korean legislative election.

Kim once again ran for the Jeonju C constituency as the Democratic Party of Korea candidate, and defeated Chung Dong-young with 66.65% of the vote.

Electoral history

See also 
 National Pension Service
 List of members of the National Assembly (South Korea), 2020–2024

References 

1964 births
Minjoo Party of Korea politicians
Korean politicians
Members of the National Assembly (South Korea)
Living people